Sienna Morris (born November 17, 1983) is an artist living in Portland, Oregon. She is an illustrator best known for her drawing technique Numberism. This technique is similar to stippling or pointillism, but uses numbers and equations in place of dots.

Nominations and Publications
In 2013, Morris's Numberism drawing Schrodinger's Cat was featured on the cover as well as in the content of the German Physics book, Faszinierende Physik: Ein bebilderter Streifzug vom Universum bis in die Welt der Elementarteilchen.

In 2014, Evolution Expo licensed the Universal Proprioception drawing as their logo for their convention  (June 27-29) celebrating the connection between science and science fiction.

Morris was nominated for the 2014 Geekie Awards in arts and crafts.

She was voted runner up for Best Visual Artist in the Willamette Week Best of Portland Readers' Poll in 2015.

The article Numberism: exploring science through art was published about Morris's work in the summer 2016 issue of Physiology News magazine.

References

External links
 Sienna Morris official website
 Sienna Morris shop on Etsy
 Article in 1859 Magazine 
 Article in Wired 
 Oregonian Article 
 Article in The Nerdist
 The Sienna Morris Numberism Collection is Fascinating (TrendHunter)
 Stephen Colbert drawn entirely with numbers (Lost at E Minor)
 MACFest artist works in pen and pencil (AZ Central)
 Sienna Morris and Numberism (Brett Bernhoft Exploring Media)

Living people
Artists from Portland, Oregon
1983 births
Mathematical artists